St. Peter Catholic Secondary School, abbreviated SPSS, is an urban high school located in Peterborough, Ontario, Canada. The school was originally opened in 1914, before moving to its current location in the mid-1990s. The school is administered by the Peterborough Victoria Northumberland and Clarington Catholic District School Board. The school is built for 1400 students from Grade 9 to 12. The school is within the Diocese of Peterborough.

Notable alumni 

 Kathryn Durst, artist and illustrator

See also
List of high schools in Ontario

References

External links
SPCSS Official Website
Peterborough Victoria Northumberland and Clairington Catholic District School Board

Catholic secondary schools in Ontario
High schools in Peterborough, Ontario
Educational institutions established in 1914
1914 establishments in Ontario